Andrew T. Winter is English-born real estate property expert, TV personality and author. He is known for presenting the British TV series Selling Houses and its Australian version Selling Houses Australia.

Career
Winter began his career as a real estate agent at the age of 17 in England. 

Winter began hosting the British TV Series Selling Houses. Since moving to Australia in 2005, he began hosting programmes in Australia.  Since 2008, he has hosted Selling Houses Australia. In 2014, he also hosted Inside Selling Houses Australia where he invited the cameras into his home.

Winter has released two property books: No-Nonsense Guide to Buying and Selling Property in December 2009 and Andrew Winter's Australian Real Estate Guide in August 2014.

In 2017, Winter co-hosted the Australian version of Canadian-based home design series Love It or List It alongside interior designer and The Block judge, Neale Whitaker.

Personal life
Andrew Winter was born in London, England, but states that he was raised in the West Country of England. 

In 2005, Winter along with his wife and three children moved to Australia. He lives on the Gold Coast, Queensland.

Awards
Winter has won the ASTRA subscriber's choice award for Favourite Male Personality in 2010, 2011, 2012, 2013 and 2014. Winter was a nominee of the 2018 Gold Logie, as well as for the Logie Award for Most Popular Presenter. Winter's nomination also marks the first time that network Foxtel has received a gold logie.

References

External links

Living people
People from Brisbane
Australian television presenters
People from New South Wales
Year of birth missing (living people)